The Brittingham Prize in Poetry is a major United States literary award for a book of poetry chosen from an open competition.

The prize, established in 1985, is sponsored by the English Department at the University of Wisconsin–Madison and is selected by a nationally recognized poet, The winner is published by the University of Wisconsin Press in its Poetry Series. Each winning poet receives $2,500 ($1,000 cash prize and $1,500 honorarium for a public reading of the work at the University of Wisconsin–Madison). The winner is announced in February each year. The prize is named for Thomas E. Brittingham and is made possible by a grant from his foundation. A $28.00 non-refundable reading fee must accompany each manuscript,

Winners

1985: Jim Daniels, Places/Everyone
1986: Patricia Dobler, Talking To Strangers. Judge: Maxine Kumin
1987: David Kirby, Saving the Young Men of Vienna
1988: Lisa Zeidner, Pocket Sundial
1989: Stefanie Marlis, Slow Joy
1990: Judith Vollmer, Level Green
1991: Renée Ashley, Salt
1992: Tony Hoagland, Sweet Ruin
1993: Stephanie Strickland, The Red Virgin: A Poem of Simone Weil
1994: Lisa Lewis, The Unbeliever
1995: Lynn Powell, Old and New Testaments
1996: Juanita Brunk, Brief Landing on the Earth's Surface
1997: Olena Kalytiak Davis, And Her Soul Out of Nothing
1998: Suzanne Paola, Bardo
1999: Frank X. Gaspar, A Field Guide to the Heavens
2000: Greg Rappleye, A Path Between Houses
2001: Robin Behn, Horizon Note
2002: Anna George Meek, Acts of Contortion
2003: Brian Teare, The Room Where I Was Born. Judge: Kelly Cherry
2004: John Brehm, Sea of Faith
2005: Susanna Childress, Jagged with Love. Judge: Billy Collins
2007: Betsy Andrews, New Jersey. Judge: Linda Gregerson
2008: Philip Pardi, Meditations on Rising and Falling
2009: Angela Sorby, Bird Skin Coat. Judge: Marilyn Nelson
2010: Jennifer Boyden, The Mouths of Grazing Things. Judge: Robert Pinsky
2011: Alison Stine, Wait. Judge: Cornelius Eady
2012: Jazzy Danziger, Darkroom. Judge: Jean Valentine
2013: Greg Wrenn, Centaur. Judge: Terrance Hayes
2014: Joanne Diaz, My Favorite Tyrants. Judge: Naomi Shihab Nye
2015: Christina Stoddard, Hive
2016: Jennifer Whitaker, The Blue Hour
2017: Nick Lantz, You, Beast
2018: Max Garland, The Word We Used for It
2019: D. M. Aderibigbe, How the End First Showed
2020: Molly Spencer, If the House
2021: Diane Kerr, Perigee
2022: Daniel Khalastchi, American Parables

See also
American poetry
List of poetry awards
List of literary awards
List of years in poetry
List of years in literature

External links
 The Brittingham Prize in Poetry Homepage
 The Brittingham Family

American poetry awards
Awards established in 1985
1985 establishments in the United States